Savitri: A Legend and a Symbol is the poetic main work of Sri Aurobindo, composed in nearly 24000 lines in blank verse. It is based on the legend of Savitri and Satyavan in the Mahabharata, which was given a symbolic significance by Sri Aurobindo. In his epic poem he deals with numerous subjects and describes especially the spiritual paths of Savitri and her father Aswapati, striving to reach a higher stage of evolution.

Origins 

Sri Aurobindo composed his poem over a long period of time. At first he worked on the narrative of Savitri as such, with the first manuscript dating back to 1916. Around 1930 he began turning it into an epic with a larger scope and deeper meaning. It now became his major literary work and he continued to expand and perfect it until his last days. In 1946 some Cantos started to appear in print in the Sri Aurobindo Ashram, and in 1950 the First Part of the first edition was published. The remaining parts were brought out the next year, after Sri Aurobindo’s passing. 
Sri Aurobindo’s disciple and secretary, the physician Nirodbaran, gives a detailed account on the genesis of Savitri in his title Twelve Years with Sri Aurobindo. He describes the poet’s long work on the epic and reports that there were “many versions, plenty of revisions, additions, subtractions, emendations from which the final version was made.” Referring to a letter from Sri Aurobindo, Nirodbaran also mentions that he used Savitri as “a means of ascension” by recording his personal experiences which went on developing and resulted in all those revisions.

Contents 

The underlying legend of Savitri and Satyavan is told in the Mahabharata where it has a length of 300 verses. Taking up this relatively short episode, Sri Aurobindo develops it into an epic poem of nearly 24000 lines with 12 Books and 49 Cantos. Thus, the original tale of conjugal fidelity is changed into a story of human liberation from Ignorance, Unconsciousness and Death through the divine grace descending on Earth in the form of Savitri. According to his own testimony, Sri Aurobindo is describing here his own spiritual odyssey and his efforts to reach a new, higher stage of evolution.

In the process he refers to a large number of subjects from the fields of history, geography, science, poetry and philosophy or treats the origin of the universe and humans. Moreover, he treats all kinds of yogic practices and especially the path of integral yoga. While the First Part (Books I-III) mainly focusses on the Yoga of King Aswapati, the Second and Third Parts especially deal with the meeting of Savitri and Satyavan, their intense love and Savitri’s battle with Yama, the God of Death, when he comes to take Satyavan’s soul and faces her indomitable resistance.

Comparison with Vyasa’s legend 

There are various differences between the original story and Sri Aurobindo’s version, which can be illustrated by the following examples:

In the legend Savitri is described as an exceptional girl of great beauty, like Shrī, the Goddess of Fortune herself, but she is not presented as a divine incarnation. In contrast, in Sri Aurobindo’s epic King Aswapati prays to the Divine Mother that she may embody herself on earth, and Savitri, her incarnation, is described as a girl not only of rare beauty, but is also said to acquire comprehensive knowledge of many philosophies, sciences, arts and crafts.

Furthermore, in the legend it says that Aswapati feels distressed when he sees that his exceptional daughter remains unmarried since no prince dares to approach her because of her radiance. Therefore the king asks his daughter to go out and seek a suitable companion herself. In comparison, Sri Aurobindo presents Aswapati as an accomplished yogi with a strong aspiration for a perfect life on earth, envisioning his daughter as the one who will realize this fulfilment. The king senses by intuition that she has not come alone, but that there must be a companion somewhere, destined to help her carrying out that mission, and for this specific purpose he sends her out. She spends a whole year on this journey, having manifold experiences and meeting various kinds of Rishis and seekers, until she finally discovers Satyavan in a forest grove.

Symbolism 

Sri Aurobindo believed that even the original tale had some deeper significance, although it got lost over time. He was convinced that some names give a clue to the true meaning of the story as revealed in his epic. Thus, Satyavan is derived from Sanskrit satya-vān, that is to say “one who carries the Truth”. As such he descends on earth, encountering its darkness. Sāvitrī means “the daughter of Savitṛ”, the Creator and creative splendour, the divine Grace in human form. Aswapati stands for aśva-pati, lit. the “Lord of the Horse”, which in Sri Aurobindo’s interpretation means “Lord of the Force”, master of spiritual power, light and strength. Satyavan’s father is Dyumatsena, from Sanskrit dyumat-sena, “the shining host”, which Sri Aurobindo interprets as the divine mind full of the rays of light. In the legend, the king is a blind man, exiled from his own kingdom due to certain circumstances, which in Sri Aurobindo’s opinion refers to Dyumatsena’s mind being temporarily exiled from his own kingdom of light and coming to the earth, blinded by Ignorance. In this way, Sri Aurobindo arrived at his own conclusions regarding the meaning of the legend and called his new creation “Savitri – A Legend and a Symbol”.

Metre and Inspiration 

Sri Aurobindo has written his epic poem in blank verse, which is a very flexible metre allowing manifold variations of cadence and rhythm. But K.D. Sethna, a poet and disciple of Sri Aurobindo, notes that the freedom of this metre “does not cut any modernistic zigzag of irregularity”. Sri Aurobindo would reject any kind of free verse without underlying and unifying rhythm. He further explains that Savitri adopts, with some adaptations, the iambic five-foot line of English blank verse as the most apt and plastic medium for this specific type of inspiration. He adds that independent text blocks with a kind of self-sufficient structure are characteristic of Sri Aurobindo’s style, and states that his verses  get a special sound and "mantric" force, because he is writing from intuitive planes beyond the mind.

Literature

Indian editions 
Sri Aurobindo’s original text has been brought out as vols. 33 and 34 of the Complete Works of Sri Aurobindo (CWSA) as well as various one-volume editions: 
 Sri Aurobindo, Savitri. A Legend and a Symbol. Pondicherry, Sri Aurobindo Ashram 1997

American edition 
 Savitri: A Legend and a Symbol, Lotus Press, Twin Lakes, Wisconsin

Secondary literature 
M.P. Pandit (2000), Introducing Savitri, Dipti Publications, Pondicherry
Mangesh V. Nadkarni (2012), Savitri. The Golden Bridge, the Wonderful Fire. An Introduction to Sri Aurobindo’s epic. Savitri Bhavan, Auroville
K.D. Sethna (2008), The Poetic Genius of Sri Aurobindo, Clear Ray Trust, Puducherry
Jugal Kishore Mukherjee (2001), The ascent of sight in Sri Aurobindo's Savitri  
D. S. Mishra (1989), Poetry and philosophy in Sri Aurobindo's Savitri 
Shraddhavan (2017-2022), The English of Savitri, vols. 1-11, Savitri Bhavan, Auroville

References

External links
 Official online text
 The Mother on Savitri
 Information on Sri Aurobindo and his writings

1954 books
Integral thought
New Age in popular culture
New Age literature
Epic poems in English
Works by Sri Aurobindo
Savitri and Satyavan
Indian poems
20th-century Indian books